Gedian South railway station is a railway station in Huarong District, Ezhou, Hubei, China.

History
This station opened with the Wuhan–Huanggang intercity railway on 18 June 2014. The line through to Jiujiang, the Wuhan–Jiujiang passenger railway, was opened on 21 September 2017.

Wuhan Metro

Gediannan Railway Station, is a station on Line 11 of the Wuhan Metro. It entered revenue service on January 2, 2021. It is located in Huarong District in Ezhou and it is the eastern terminus of Line 11.

References

Railway stations in Hubei
Railway stations in China opened in 2014
Wuhan Metro stations
Line 11, Wuhan Metro